Kazanlak Airport is a grass airfield which serves the city of Kazanlak. The airport is near the Ovoshtnik village, about 9 km south from the city center of Kazanlak. It is also known as Kazanlak Airfield.

Due to its good location, near the Shipka Top, Stara Zagora Spa Resort and Sevtopolis (Thrace capital), the airport is mainly active for crop-duster planes and some charters.

See also 
 Stara Zagora Airport
 List of airports in Bulgaria

References 

Airports in Bulgaria
Buildings and structures in Stara Zagora Province